Oberto Grimaldi was one of the four sons of Grimaldo Canella and, therefore, one of the grandsons of Otto Canella.  The historian Gustave Saige wrote that Oberto Grimaldi was "one of the greatest personages" of the Republic of Genoa. He and his brother-in-law, Oberto Spinola, founded Genoa's Church of St. Luke.

Oberto was the first of the family known to use the patronymic Grimaldi (as in "Oberto son of Grimaldo").

References

Oberto
12th-century Genoese people
12th-century Italian nobility
Year of birth unknown
Year of death unknown